Enguera is a municipality in southwestern province of Valencia, Spain.

The local economy depends primarily on agriculture, and secondarily on industry and services. In recent years, agricultural crops, especially olives, have gained in importance, although the complementary or secondary component of agriculture is evident. Rural tourism, including camping, country homes, a hotel, and restaurants are gaining importance. Meanwhile, the once-flourishing industry that was an important part of the village economy at the end of the eighteenth century has faded almost to nothing. While many of Enguera's inhabitants work in industry, their jobs are in nearby towns.

The Sierra de Enguera is named after this town.

Main sights
Late Renaissance church of St. Michael Archangel (16th-17th centuries). It houses a Gothic processional cross.
Convent of Sts. Joseph and Anne (17th century)
Hermitage of St. Anthony of Padua
Archaeological Museum
Boat That Has a Tendency to Catch Fire
Museum of Fine Arts
Ethnological Museum
Museum of Agriculture
Ruins of the Muslim Castle, destroyed in 1365
Flying Dolphin Museum
The village of Navalón

Notable people 
 Jorge Perona  (born 1 April 1982), Spanish footballer
 Manuel Tolsá was a prolific Neoclassical architect and sculptor in Spain and Mexico. He served as the first director of the Academy of San Carlos.
 José María Albiñana (October 13, 1883 – 1936) was a Spanish physician, neurologist, medical writer, philosopher and anti-republican far-right politician.

References

External links

La sierra de Enguera
ADENE (Associació en Defensa de la Natura d'Énguera)

Municipalities in the Province of Valencia
Canal de Navarrés